Muslim Muhammad oghlu Magomayev ( / ) or Muslim Magometovich Magomayev (17 August 1942 – 25 October 2008), known simply as Muslim Magomayev and dubbed the "Soviet Sinatra", was a Soviet, Azerbaijani and Russian opera and pop singer. He achieved iconic status in Russia and the post-Soviet countries for his vocal talent and charisma. People's Artist of the USSR (1973).

Early life
Muslim Magomayev represented one of the most respected artistic dynasties in Azerbaijan. His grandfather Muslim Magomayev (1885–1937), a friend and contemporary of the prominent Azerbaijani composer Uzeyir Hajibeyov, was one of the founders of modern Azerbaijani classical music. Magomayev's father, Mahammad Magomayev, who died two days prior to the defeat of Nazi Germany in World War II while serving as a soldier in the Soviet Army, was a gifted scenic designer; and his mother, Aishet Kinzhalova, was an actress, who deserted him with his grandmother when he was less than a year old. Magomayev's father was of mixed origin whose parents moved to Azerbaijan from Chechnya and Georgia respectively, whereas his Adygea-born mother was paternally of Turkish origin and maternally of Adyghe and Russian descent. However, when asked about his ethnicity, Magomayev considered himself Azerbaijani.

Abandoned by his mother after his father's death, Magomayev was raised by his paternal grandmother. He learned to play the piano as a child, and began to take voice lessons at the age of 14. As a teenager, he became interested in Italian songs, American jazz, and other styles of popular music. He majored in piano and composition at the Baku Academy of Music.

Musical career

He was 19 when he first performed at an international youth music festival in Helsinki. His performance was noted by Yekaterina Furtseva, then Minister of Culture of the Soviet Union, who offered him to be a soloist at the Bolshoi Theatre. Magomayev declined the offer. In 1962, at the age of 20, Magomayev first appeared in Moscow where he performed during the Days of Azerbaijani Culture. He sang an aria from Gounod’s Faust, and the song "Do the Russians Want War?" in a gala concert at the Kremlin Palace of Congresses, and became a celebrity on the spot. He recorded three songs with Azerbaijani composer Asya Sultanova. A year later, he gave his first solo concert in the Moscow Tchaikovsky Concert Hall to a full house and became a soloist of the Azerbaijan State Academic Opera and Ballet Theater. Muslim earned fame in the USSR as an opera singer with his performance in Rossini's "The Barber of Seville". He also became known for his arias from Puccini's "Tosca", Hajibeyov's "Koroghlu" and "Shah Ismayil", which was composed by his grandfather.

In 1964 and 1965, Muslim was a visiting artist at La Scala in Milan, but turned down the invitation to sing in the Moscow Bolshoi Theatre upon his return. Instead, the singer turned to popular music, becoming a cult figure of soviet estrada for several generations of music lovers in the Soviet Union. Muslim Magomayev's popularity in the USSR was overwhelming. He used to gave three concerts a day filling huge arenas all across the Soviet Union, while his albums sold millions.

In 1966 and 1969, Magomayev performed in Olympia with great success. The director of Olympia Bruno Coquatrix offered him a contract, and Magomayev was seriously considering an opportunity to pursue an international career, but Yekaterina Furtseva refused to grant the Ministry of Culture's permission, claiming that it needed Magomayev to perform at government concerts. In 1969, he received the Midem Gold Disc Award in Cannes for album sales of over 4.5 million units. In 1973, at the age of 31, Muslim was awarded the Soviet Union's highest artistic title: People's Artist of the USSR.

Magomayev moved to Moscow in the early 1970s. He became the art director of the Azerbaijan State Bandstand-Symphonic Orchestra in 1975 and toured in Italy, France, Bulgaria, Finland, Canada, United States, Cuba and other countries.

Magomayev was also known as a composer, writing several film soundtracks and songs. In addition, Magomayev acted in films and hosted television and radio broadcasts devoted to prominent musicians of the 20th century.

Magomayev was an influence on many important Soviet musical figures including Alla Pugacheva, who often spoke fondly of him.

Personal life
Magomayev married when he was 19, to Ofelia Veliyeva, but the union did not last a year. His daughter from that first marriage, Marina, lives in the United States. He eventually remarried, this time to the opera singer Tamara Sinyavskaya.

In later life, Magomayev struggled with a serious heart condition.

Later years

In the early 2000s, Magomayev officially stopped his musical career and gave only a few performances, together with his wife. He died on 25 October 2008 in his flat in Moscow from a heart attack. He was buried in the Alley of Honor in his native city of Baku, next to his grandfather, on 29 October. The funeral ceremony was attended by Azerbaijani President Ilham Aliyev, Magomayev's widow Tamara Sinyavskaya, his daughter Marina, as well as state officials and international delegations. Thousands of people came to pay a final tribute to the singer.

Honors and awards
Orders
 Istiglal Order (Azerbaijan, 2002)
 Shohrat Order (Azerbaijan, 1997)
 Order of Honour (Russia, 2002)
 Order of the Red Banner of Labour (USSR, 1971)
 Order of Friendship of Peoples (USSR, 1980)

Titles
People's Artist of the USSR (1973) 
People's Artist of Azerbaijan SSR (1964)
Honoured Artist of Azerbaijan SSR (1971)
Honoured Artist of Chechen-Ingush ASSR

Awards
 Miner's Glory Medal 3rd degree
 Badge «For services to the Polish culture» 
In 1997, a minor planet of the Solar System, 4980 Magomaev, was named in his honor.

Popular songs
 
"Azerbaijan" ("Azərbaycan") 
"Blagodaryu tebya" ("Благодарю тебя") – Grateful to You 
"Chyortovo koleso" ("Чёртово колесо") – Ferris wheel
"Golubaya tayga" ("Голубая тайга") – Blue Taiga
"Koroleva krasoty" ("Королева красоты") – The Queen of the Beauty
"Luch solntsa zolotovo" ("Луч солнца золотого") – Sunbeam of the Golden Sun
"Luchshy gorod Zemli" ("Лучший город Земли") – The Best City on Earth
"Melodia" ("Мелодия") – Melody
"Nam ne zhit drug bez druga" ("Нам не жить друг без друга") – We Can't Live Without One Another
"Ne speshi" ("Не спеши") – Don't Rush
"Noktyurn" ("Ноктюрн") – Nocturne
"Serdtse na snegu" ("Сердце на снегу") – Heart on the Snow
"Solntsem opyanyonnyy" ("Солнцем опьянённый") – Intoxicated by the Sun
"Sinyaya vechnost" ("Синяя вечность") – Blue Eternity
"Svadba" ("Свадьба") – Wedding 
"Vdol po Piterskoy" ("Вдоль по Питерской") – Down the Peterskaya Road
"Verni mne muziku" (""Верни мне музыку") – Return the Music to Me

See also 
 Monument to Muslim Magomayev

Notes

References

External links

Times Online Obituary. Muslim Magomaev: popular singer known as the "Soviet Sinatra".
Muslim Magomaev's website

ITAR-TASS. Moscow pays last respects to famous singer Muslim Magomayev
Muslim Magomaev on YouTube
"The Show Must Go On: Memories of Accompanying Azerbaijan's Greatest Singers," By Chingiz Sadikhov, in Azerbaijan International, Vol. 10:3 (Autumn 2002), pp. 60–63.

1942 births
2008 deaths
20th-century Azerbaijani male singers
Musicians from Baku
Baku Academy of Music alumni
People's Artists of the Azerbaijan SSR
People's Artists of the USSR
Recipients of the Decoration of Honor Meritorious for Polish Culture
Recipients of the Istiglal Order
Recipients of the Order of Friendship of Peoples
Recipients of the Order of Honour (Russia)
Recipients of the Order of the Red Banner of Labour
20th-century Azerbaijani male opera singers
Azerbaijani pop singers
Azerbaijani people of Russian descent
Azerbaijani people of Turkish descent
20th-century Russian male singers
20th-century Russian singers
Russian pop singers
Operatic baritones
Soviet male opera singers
Soviet male singers
Soviet pop singers
Soviet Azerbaijani people
Burials at Alley of Honor